Cletidus Marquell Hunt (born January 2, 1976) is a former defensive tackle in the National Football League and the Arena Football League.

Early life
Hunt was born in Memphis, Tennessee, and played college football for Kentucky State University.

NFL career
Hunt was drafted by the Green Bay Packers in the 1999 NFL Draft. In his NFL career, he has amassed 119 tackles, 17 sacks, and played in 85 games.

AFL career 
Hunt signed with the New York Dragons of the Arena Football League on May 23, 2007. On November 2, 2007, Hunt was waived by the Dragons.

References

External links
NFL.com player page
AFL stats

1976 births
Living people
American football defensive tackles
Green Bay Packers players
Kentucky State Thorobreds football players
New York Dragons players
Northwest Mississippi Rangers football players
Players of American football from Memphis, Tennessee